The Musée de la Culture Diola (aka Musée de la Tradition Diola and Diola Museum) is a museum located in Mlomp, Casamance, Ziguinchor Region, Senegal.

The museum covers Diola culture. It is located among tall kapok trees between Elinkine and Oussouye. A guide at the museum is there to explain some of museum's objects. These include baskets used as fish traps, gris-gris worn as amulets, hoops for climbing palm trees, pestle and mortar for making palm wine, and shields made of hippopotamus hide. There are also African musical instruments.

See also
 List of museums in Senegal

References

External links
 

Museums with year of establishment missing
Museums in Senegal
Folk museums in Africa
Casamance